Events from the year 1604 in Sweden

Incumbents
 Monarch – Charles IX

Events
 - The Regent is formally acknowledged as King Charles IX of Sweden after John, Duke of Östergötland renounced his claim to the throne, and all non-Lutherans are banned from inheriting the throne.
 - The city of Göteborg is founded.
 25 September - Polish victory in the Battle of Weissenstein.

Births

 October 14 - Nils Brahe, soldier   (died 1632)

Deaths

References

 
Years of the 17th century in Sweden
Sweden